Post-rock is a form of experimental rock characterized by a focus on exploring textures and timbre over traditional rock song structures, chords, or riffs. Post-rock artists are often instrumental, typically combining rock instrumentation with electronics. The genre emerged within the indie and underground music scene of the 1980s and early 1990s. However, due to its abandonment of rock conventions, it often bears little resemblance musically to contemporary indie rock, borrowing instead from diverse sources including ambient, electronica, jazz, krautrock, dub, and minimalist classical.

Artists such as Talk Talk and Slint have been credited with producing foundational works in the style in the early 1990s. The term post-rock itself was notably employed by journalist Simon Reynolds in a review of the 1994 Bark Psychosis album Hex. It later solidified into a recognizable trend with the release of Tortoise's 1996 album Millions Now Living Will Never Die. The term has since been used to describe bands which differ widely in style, making the term controversial among listeners and artists alike.

Etymology
The concept of "post-rock" was developed by critic Simon Reynolds, who used the term in his review of Bark Psychosis' album Hex, published in the March 1994 issue of Mojo magazine. Reynolds expanded upon the idea later in the May 1994 issue of The Wire. Writing about artists like Seefeel, Disco Inferno, Techno Animal, Robert Hampson, and Insides, Reynolds used the term to describe music "using rock instrumentation for non-rock purposes, using guitars as facilitators of timbre and textures rather than riffs and power chords". He further expounded on the term, 

Reynolds, in a July 2005 entry in his blog, claimed he had used the concept of "post-rock" before using it in Mojo, previously referencing it in a feature on the band Insides for music newspaper Melody Maker. He also said he later found the term itself not to be of his own coinage, saying in his blog, "I discovered many years later it had been floating around for over a decade." In 2021, Reynolds noted that the term had developed in meaning during the 21st century, no longer referring to "left-field UK guitar groups engaged in a gradual process of abandoning songs [and exploring] texture, effects processing, and space," but instead coming to signify "epic and dramatic instrumental rock, not nearly as post- as it likes to think it is."

Earlier uses of the term include its employment in a 1975 article by American journalist James Wolcott about musician Todd Rundgren, although with a different meaning. It was also used in the Rolling Stone Album Guide to name a style roughly corresponding to "avant-rock" or "out-rock". The earliest use of the term cited by Reynolds dates back as far as September 1967. In a Time cover story feature on the Beatles, writer Christopher Porterfield hails the band and producer George Martin's creative use of the recording studio, declaring that this is "leading an evolution in which the best of current post-rock sounds are becoming something that pop music has never been before: an art form." Another pre-1994 example of the term in use can be found in an April 1992 review of 1990s noise-pop band The Earthmen by Steven Walker in Melbourne music publication Juke, where he describes a "post-rock noisefest".

Characteristics

The post-rock sound incorporates characteristics from a variety of musical genres, including krautrock, ambient, psychedelia, prog rock, space rock, math rock, tape music, minimalist classical, British IDM, jazz (both avant-garde and cool), and dub reggae, as well as post-punk, free jazz, contemporary classical, and avant-garde electronica. It also bears similarities to drone music. Early post-rock groups also often exhibited strong influence from the krautrock of the 1970s, particularly borrowing elements of "motorik", the characteristic krautrock rhythm.

Post-rock compositions often make use of repetition of musical motifs and subtle changes with an extremely wide range of dynamics. In some respects, this is similar to the music of Steve Reich, Philip Glass and Brian Eno, pioneers of minimalism. Typically, post-rock pieces are lengthy and instrumental, containing repetitive build-ups of timbre, dynamics and texture.

Vocals are often omitted from post-rock; however, this does not necessarily mean they are absent entirely. When vocals are included, the use is typically non-traditional: some post-rock bands employ vocals as purely instrumental efforts and incidental to the sound, rather than a more traditional use where "clean", easily interpretable vocals are important for poetic and lyrical meaning. When present, post-rock vocals are often soft or droning and are typically infrequent or present in irregular intervals. Sigur Rós, a band known for their distinctive vocals, fabricated a language they called "Hopelandic" ("Vonlenska" in Icelandic), which they described as "a form of gibberish vocals that fits to the music and acts as another instrument."

In lieu of typical rock structures like the verse-chorus form, post-rock groups generally make greater use of soundscapes. Simon Reynolds states in his "Post-Rock" from Audio Culture that "A band's journey through rock to post-rock usually involves a trajectory from narrative lyrics to stream-of-consciousness to voice-as-texture to purely instrumental music". Reynolds' conclusion defines the sporadic progression from rock, with its field of sound and lyrics to post-rock, where samples are stretched and looped.

Wider experimentation and blending of other genres have recently taken hold in the post-rock scene. Cult of Luna, Isis, Russian Circles, Palms, Deftones, and Pelican have fused metal with post-rock styles. The resulting sound has been termed post-metal. More recently, sludge metal has grown and evolved to include (and in some cases fuse completely with) some elements of post-rock. This second wave of sludge metal has been pioneered by bands such as Giant Squid and Battle of Mice. This new sound is often seen on the label of Neurot Recordings. Similarly, bands such as Altar of Plagues, Lantlôs and Agalloch blend between post-rock and black metal, incorporating elements of the former while primarily using the latter. In some cases, this sort of experimentation and blending has gone beyond the fusion of post-rock with a single genre, as in the case of post-metal, in favor of an even wider embrace of disparate musical influences as it can be heard in bands like Deafheaven.

History

Early precedents
Post-rock takes a heavy influence from late 1960s U.S. group The Velvet Underground and their "dronology"—"a term that loosely describes fifty percent of today's post rock activity". A 2004 article from Stylus Magazine noted that David Bowie's album Low (1977) would have been considered post-rock if released twenty years later.

British group Public Image Ltd (PiL) were also pioneers, described by the NME as "arguably the first post-rock group". Their second album Metal Box (1979) almost completely abandoned traditional rock and roll structures in favor of dense, repetitive dub and krautrock inspired soundscapes and John Lydon's cryptic, stream-of-consciousness lyrics. The year before Metal Box was released, PiL bassist Jah Wobble declared, "rock is obsolete". Dean McFarlane of AllMusic describes Alternative TV's Vibing Up the Senile Man (Part One) (1979) as "a door opening on multi-faceted post-rock music," citing its drawing on avant-garde, noise and jazz.

This Heat are regarded as having predated the genre because of their unique combination of avant-prog, krautrock, and industrial music. Their music has been compared directly to Slint, Swans and  Stereolab. Stump have been referred to as "a significant precursor to post-rock" due to the "strictness" of the band's avant-garde approach.

1990s
Bands from the early 1990s, such as Slint or, earlier, Talk Talk, were later recognized as influential on post-rock. Despite the fact that the two bands are very different from one another, Talk Talk emerging from art rock and new wave and Slint emerging from post-hardcore, they both have had a driving influence on the way post-rock progressed throughout the 1990s.

Originally used to describe the music of English bands such as Stereolab, Laika, Disco Inferno, Moonshake, Seefeel, Bark Psychosis, and Pram, post-rock grew to be frequently used for a variety of jazz and krautrock influenced, largely instrumental, and electronica-tinged music made after 1994.

Groups such as Cul de Sac, Tortoise, Labradford, Bowery Electric and Stars of the Lid are cited as founders of a distinctly American post-rock movement. The second Tortoise  LP  Millions Now Living Will Never Die, made the band a post-rock icon. Many bands (e.g., Do Make Say Think) began to record music inspired by the "Tortoise-sound".

In the late 1990s, Chicago was the home base for a variety of post-rock associated performers. Both John McEntire of Tortoise and Jim O'Rourke of Brise-Glace and Gastr del Sol were important producers for many of the groups. One of the most eminent post-rock locales is Montreal, where Godspeed You! Black Emperor and similar groups, including Silver Mt. Zion and Fly Pan Am record on Constellation Records, a notable post-rock record label. These groups are generally characterized by an aesthetic rooted in, among other genres, musique concrète, chamber music, and free jazz.

2000s–2010s
In the early 2000s, the term had started to fall out of favor. It became increasingly controversial as more critics outwardly condemned its use. Some of the bands for whom the term was most frequently assigned, including Cul de Sac, Tortoise, and Mogwai, rejected the label. The wide range of styles covered by the term, they and others have claimed, rob it of its usefulness.

In 2000, Radiohead released the studio album Kid A, marking a turning point in their musical style. Sigur Rós, with the release of Ágætis byrjun in 1999, became among the most well known post-rock bands of the 2000s. In part this was due to the use of many of their tracks, particularly their 2005 single "Hoppípolla", in TV soundtracks and film trailers, including the BBC's Planet Earth. Their popularity can at least somewhat be attributed to a move towards a more rock oriented sound with simpler song structures and increasing utilization of pop hooks.

Explosions in the Sky, 65daysofstatic, This Will Destroy You, Do Make Say Think, Godspeed You! Black Emperor, and Mono are some of the more popular post-rock bands of the new millennium. Following a 13-year hiatus, experimental rock band Swans have released a number of albums that exhibit post-rock traits, most notably To Be Kind, which was named one of AllMusic's favorite indie pop and rock albums of 2014. The Swedish post-rock band Oh Hiroshima received positive reception for their album In Silence We Yearn, released in 2015.

See also
List of post-rock bands
Post-metal
Electronic music

References

 
Alternative rock genres
Electronic rock
British rock music genres
1980s in music
1990s in music
2000s in music
2010s in music
American rock music genres